Jan-Lennard Struff was the defending champion, but he lost in the semifinals to Alexander Zverev.

Zverev went on to win the title, defeating Guido Pella in the final, 6–1, 7–6(9–7).

Seeds

Draw

Finals

Top half

Bottom half

References
 Main Draw
 Qualifying Draw

Heilbronner Neckarcup - Singles
2015 Singles